San Francesco d'Assisi a Monte Mario encompass two Roman Catholic churches located in Piazza di Monte Gaudio #8, in Rome, Italy.

Description
Presently, the site has a modern church and an older church structures. The older church and an adjacent monastery, built circa 1670, were erected by the Hieronymite order. It was initially titled Sant'Onofrio in Campagna and located in the Borgo Clementino. Located on the entry of the Via Francigena towards central Rome, the church changed the dedication to St Francis of Assisi. It was made a parish church by pope Clement XI. 

In 2003, a new church was designed by Anna Claudia Cenciarini. The church has a sculpted frieze. It is presently under the administration of the Scolopi order.

Gallery

Note 

Churches in Rome